Half the Picture is a 2018 documentary film by Amy Adrion about women directors in Hollywood and the struggles they face.

Interviewed for this film
Stacy Smith (USC Annenberg Inclusion Initiative) 
Martha Lauzen (San Diego State University) 
Ava DuVernay
Mary Harron
Penelope Spheeris
Catherine Hardwicke
Brenda Chapman
Miranda July
Lena Dunham
Martha Coolidge
Kimberly Peirce

Reception
The film earned acclaim for its personal approach regarding how women directors navigate Hollywood sexism, centering stories from women directors themselves.

References

External links

Half the Picture on Rotten Tomatoes

2018 films
Documentary films about films
Sexism
American documentary films
2010s English-language films
2010s American films